The Golden Gate Villa is a Queen Anne style house built in 1891 in Santa Cruz, California. The house was designed by San Francisco architect Thomas J. Welsh for Major Frank McLaughlin, a mining engineer and California politician. Visitors to Golden Gate Villa included Theodore Roosevelt and Thomas Edison. In the 1940s the house was operated as a restaurant, the Palais Monte Carlo.  After passing through several owners, in 1963 the house was purchased by seafood magnate William W. Durney and his screenwriter wife Dorothy Kingsley, who sold it to the present owner. On July 24, 1975, the Golden Gate Villa was added to the United States National Register of Historic Places.

References

External links 

The Golden Gate Villa by Susan Dormanen

Santa Cruz, California
History of Santa Cruz County, California
History of the Monterey Bay Area
Houses on the National Register of Historic Places in California
Houses on the National Register of Historic Places in Santa Cruz County, California
Houses completed in 1891
Houses in Santa Cruz County, California
Queen Anne architecture in California
National Register of Historic Places in Santa Cruz County, California